Route 242 is a collector road in the Canadian province of Nova Scotia. 

It is located in Cumberland County and connects Joggins at Route 209 with Maccan at Route 302. It is designated as part of the Fundy Shore Scenic Drive.

Communities
Joggins
River Hebert
Maccan

See also
List of Nova Scotia provincial highways

References

Roads in Cumberland County, Nova Scotia
Nova Scotia provincial highways